Luis Agustín Zanoni (born Buenos Aires, 18 October 1966) is a former Argentine rugby union player.

He played for Pueyrredón Rugby Club.

He was called for Argentina for the 1991 Rugby World Cup, but was one of the two players who was never capped for the "Pumas".

References

External links

1966 births
Living people
Argentine rugby union players
Rugby union players from Buenos Aires
Rugby union locks